Bradley Maxwell Selway  (9 January 1955 – 10 April 2005) was a Judge of the Federal Court of Australia from 2002 until his death.

Early life and education
Selway was born on 9 January 1955 in Gawler, South Australia. His secondary education, for which he had a full scholarship, was undertaken at Westminster School, Adelaide. He went on to study law at the University of Adelaide from 1973 to 1976.

Career
After graduating from law school, he worked for many years in the South Australian Crown Law Office. From the 1980s, he was appointed to a series of senior posts: Crown Solicitor (1989), Queen's Counsel (1994) and Solicitor-General (1995-2002).

In 2002, Selway was appointed as a Federal Court Judge, as well as Adjunct Professor of the University of Adelaide Law School. He died on 10 April 2005, aged 50.

Published works
 Public Law and the South Australian Crown (1990)
 The Constitution of South Australia (1997)

References

1955 births
2005 deaths
Judges of the Federal Court of Australia
People from Gawler, South Australia
People educated at Westminster School, Adelaide
Adelaide Law School alumni
Solicitors-General of South Australia
Australian King's Counsel